Florent Fortier (born June 1, 1955) is a Canadian former professional ice hockey forward. He was drafted by the World Hockey Association's Quebec Nordiques in the tenth round, 137th overall, of the 1975 WHA Amateur Draft. He played four games with the Nordiques during the 1975–76 season, scoring one goal and one assist. As a youth, he played in the 1968 Quebec International Pee-Wee Hockey Tournament with a minor ice hockey team in Beauport, Quebec City.

References

External links

1955 births
Living people
Canadian ice hockey forwards
French Quebecers
Maine Nordiques players
Ice hockey people from Quebec City
Quebec Nordiques (WHA) draft picks
Quebec Nordiques (WHA) players
Quebec Remparts players